Hoppeia is a Gram-negative, rod-shaped and strictly aerobic genus of bacteria from the family of Flavobacteriaceae with one known species (Hoppeia youngheungensis).

References

Flavobacteria
Bacteria genera
Monotypic bacteria genera
Taxa described in 2014